Bungarus bungaroides, the northeastern hill krait, is a  venomous species of elapid snake.

Description 
This is a moderate- to large sized krait.
Diagnostic characters:
 Dorsal scales in 15 longitudinal rows at midbody. Mid-dorsal scales are slightly enlarged anteriorly, but distinctly enlarged posteriorly.
 Subcaudal scutes ordinarily divided anteriorly, but occasionally some scutes may be single, but always divided near the tip
 Ventrals 220–237; subcaudals 44-51
 Dorsum – smooth, black with a series of very narrow white to pale yellowish lines or crossbars; on the belly, the light crossbars widen to form distinct transverse bars
 head slightly distinct from the neck. Top of the head is flat. Snout is blunt.
 Total length of largest male 1400 mm (55 in); tail length 160 mm (6.3 in)

Distribution and habitat 
This species is found in Myanmar, India (Assam, Cachar, Sikkim), Nepal, and Vietnam at elevations around 2040 m as well as in Tibet. The type locality is given as: "Cherra Punjee, Khasi Hills, Meghalaya, India".

References 

 Boulenger, G. A. 1890. The Fauna of British India, Including Ceylon and Burma. Reptilia and Batrachia. Taylor & Francis. London. xviii, 541 pp.
 Cantor, T.E. 1839. Spicilegium serpentium indicorum [parts 1 and 2]. Proc. Zool. Soc. London 7:31-34,49-55.
 Golay, P. 1985. Checklist and keys to the terrestrial proteroglyphs of the world (Serpentes: Elapidae – Hydrophiidae). Elapsoidea, Geneva.
 Slowinski, J. B. 1994. A phylogenetic analysis of Bungarus (Elapidae) based on morphological characters. Journal of Herpetology 28(4):440-446.

bungaroides
Reptiles of Myanmar
Reptiles of China
Reptiles of India
Reptiles of Nepal
Reptiles of Vietnam
Taxa named by Theodore Edward Cantor
Reptiles described in 1839
Snakes of China
Snakes of Vietnam
Snakes of Asia